Worcester Technical High School (WTHS) is a vocational-technical high school, part of Worcester Public Schools district in Worcester, Massachusetts, United States. It opened on August 28, 2006, replacing the old Worcester Vocational High School (formerly known as Worcester Boys' Trade High School from 1909 to about 1975) at 2 Grove Street. The school was also known for a period as Worcester Vocational Technical High School (WVTHS) beginning around 1975. When the David Hale Fanning Trade School (commonly called "Girls' Trade" or DHFTS) in Worcester closed its Chatham Street premises some years later, the curriculum, staff and student body transferred to WVTHS. Since many new non-technical areas of study were added by the merging of the two schools, the word "Technical" was dropped from the school's name.

When the school moved to Green Hill, the name was once again changed to its current title of Worcester Technical High School. With this move also came the change of the school mascot, going from the Bulldogs to the Eagles. There are many different rumors as to why this happened seeing as how the Bulldog was very closely associated with Worcester Tech for many years.

Worcester Technical High School has 22 different trades from which students can choose, from the 4 different Academies – Alden Design and Engineering (Alden), Allied Health and Human Services (A.H./service), Coghlin Construction Academy (construction), Information Technology and Business Service (I.T.)

In 2013, then-principal Sheila Harrity was named National Principal of the Year by the National Association of Secondary School Principals. Kyle Brenner replaced Harrity as Principal in 2014, and he relieved this position in 2020. The school's current acting principal is Siobahn Petrella, who once served as an assistant principal. 

In 2014, President Barack Obama gave a speech for the school's Commencement Ceremony.

Students run a restaurant, salon, automotive service center, bank, and preschool, as well as a veterinary clinic in partnership with Cummings School of Veterinary Medicine.

Academics
Students attend academic classes for half the time, and technical classes the other half the time.

Advanced Placement

Technical Areas
Worcester Tech offers 22 trade specialties grouped into 4 academies.

Athletics

Notable alumni
 Tim Collins (2003–2007), Major League Baseball pitcher for the Kansas City Royals.
 Bruno Haas, former Major League Baseball player (Philadelphia Athletics)

References

External links
Worcester Technical High School official site.
Machining – Worcester Gets Manufacturing Education Right
Worcester Telegram & Gazette – Thursday, November 9, 2006 – Vocation students get edge in trades – Unions ease apprentice entry rules
Massachusetts Department of Education – Worcester Technical High

Educational institutions established in 2006
High schools in Worcester, Massachusetts
Public high schools in Massachusetts
2006 establishments in Massachusetts